Prays delta is a moth of the family Plutellidae. It is found on the island of Honshu in  Japan and has also been recorded from China.

The wingspan is 12–13 mm.

References

 , 2011, A taxonomic review of Prays Hübner, 1825 (Lepidoptera: Yponomeutoidea: Praydidae) China with descriptions of two new species. Tijdschrift voor Entomologie 154 (1): 25-32.

Plutellidae
Moths of Japan
Moths described in 1977